The Mammal Paleogene zones or MP zones are system of biostratigraphic zones in the stratigraphic record used to correlate mammal-bearing fossil localities of the Paleogene period of Europe. It consists of thirty consecutive zones (numbered MP 1 through MP 30; MN 8 and 9 have been joined into MN 8 + 9 zone; and MP 17 zone is split into two zones - MP 17A and MP 17B zone) defined through reference faunas, well-known sites that other localities can be correlated with. MP 1 is the earliest zone, and MP 30 is the most recent. The MP zones are complementary with the MN zones in the Neogene.

These zones were proposed at the Congress in Mainz held in 1987 to help paleontologists provide more specific reference points to evolutionary events in Europe, but are used by paleontologists on other continents as well.

The zones are as follows:

See also
 MN zonation
 European land mammal age
 Geologic time scale

References

 
Regional geologic time scales
Biochronology
Paleogene Europe
Paleogene mammals
•